Washington Square Historic District is a national historic district located at Oswego in Oswego County, New York. It includes 39 contributing buildings, one contributing structure, and one contributing site.  It encompasses the historic civic and religious center on the east side of the city.  There are 37 residences, four churches, a synagogue, a public green, the county office building, and County Courthouse, and a former railroad tunnel.  Located within the district are the separately listed Hamilton and Rhoda Littlefield House, Richardson-Bates House, Oswego City Library, and Oswego County Courthouse.  Washington Park was laid out in 1797 when the city of Oswego was laid out.

It was listed on the National Register of Historic Places in 2009.

References

Historic districts on the National Register of Historic Places in New York (state)
Historic districts in Oswego County, New York
National Register of Historic Places in Oswego County, New York